Hughie Lee-Smith (September 20, 1915 – February 23, 1999) was an American artist and teacher whose surreal paintings often featured distant figures under vast skies, and desolate urban settings.

Life
Lee-Smith was born in Eustis, Florida to Luther and Alice Williams Smith; in art school he altered his last name to sound more distinguished. Shortly after his birth, Lee's parents divorced and his mother moved to Cleveland to pursue a music career. As a child Lee-Smith moved to Atlanta to live with his grandmother. She was strict with Lee-Smith, and when carnivals came to town she would not allow him to attend, an event which he describes as an experience which "must have sunk into my unconscious and manifested itself years later in my paintings: the balloons, ribbons, pennants." At age 10 he moved to Cleveland with his mother and grandmother (once his mother established her music career), and attended classes at the Cleveland Museum of Art, and later the Cleveland Institute of Art and the John Huntington Polytechnic Institute, the Art School of the Detroit Society of Arts & Crafts (Center For Creative Studies, College of Art & Design)and Wayne State University (BA 1953.)

Lee-Smith attended East Technical High School (where he was president of the art club and ran track with Jesse Owens) during the tenure of Harold Hunsicker as head of its art department. As a youth, he was active at Karamu as a dancer, performer, studio enrollee, and teacher trainee.

In 1938, Lee-Smith graduated with honors from the Cleveland School of Art and worked for the Federal Arts Project of the Works Progress Administration (WPA). Like many WPA artists, Lee-Smith was concerned about the contribution art could make to the struggle for social justice and racial equality, and he created a series of lithographs on this theme. Lee-Smith's “The Artist’s Life No.1,” a 1939 lithograph, is one of his early masterpieces. It is currently featured in an exhibition called “Hardship to Hope: African American Art from the Karamu Workshop” at the Maltz Museum of Jewish Heritage, 2929 Richmond Road, Beachwood, Ohio.

Lee-Smith's first job as an art teacher was at Claflin College in Orangeburg, S.C., in 1940. Newly married to Mabel Louise Everett, they returned to Orangeburg. The pay was so poor for a man with a new bride that Lee-Smith gave up and moved to Detroit. He got a job as a core maker in one of Henry Ford's factories. He worked there for about three years before joining the Navy for a 19-month stint. Stationed at the Great Lakes Naval Training Center north of Chicago, Lee-Smith was one of three African-American artists commissioned to do “morale-building paintings” of Blacks in the Navy. While in the Navy he painted a mural entitled History of the Negro in the U.S. Navy. He also did portraits of the first Black naval officers.

Hughie Lee-Smith and Mabel Louise Everett divorced in 1953. Although his divorce was amiable, it had a “deathlike” impact on Lee-Smith.

After his long journey and hard work he received a Bachelor of Science, in Art Education (Graduated 1953) from Wayne State University in Detroit.

Many years after winning a top prize for painting from the Detroit Institute of Arts in 1953, he recalled

I was no longer called black artist, Negro artist, colored boy. When I won that prize, all of a sudden, there was no longer a racial designation.

In 1958 Lee-Smith moved to New York City, and taught at the Art Students League for 15 years. Later he moved to Cranbury, New Jersey.

His paintings evidenced the influence of Cubism, Social realism, and Surrealism at the service of a personal expression that was poignant and enigmatic. Of his characteristic work, Holland Cotter wrote in The New York Times,

Mr. Lee-Smith's paintings usually have spare settings suggestive of theater stages or bleak urban or seaside landscapes. Walls stretch out under gray skies. Men and women, as lithe as dancers, seem frozen in place. Most are dressed in street clothes; some wear exotic masks. Children frequently appear, as do props reminiscent of circuses. The work has an air of mystery associated with the paintings of Giorgio de Chirico and Edward Hopper.

In 1967 Lee-Smith became an associate member of the National Academy of Design, then the second African-American to be elected to the Academy, after Henry Ossawa Tanner, and was made a full member four years later. In 1994 he was commissioned to paint the official portrait of David Dinkins, former Mayor of New York City, for the New York City Hall. Retrospectives of Lee-Smith's work were mounted by the New Jersey State Museum and the Studio Museum in Harlem in 1988, and Ogunquit Museum of American Art in 1997. Lee-Smith's works are included in the collections of the Metropolitan Museum of Art, the Smithsonian American Art Museum, the Detroit Institute of Art, Howard University, the San Diego Museum of Art, and Schomburg Center for Research in Black Culture in Manhattan.

Lee-Smith met Patricia Thomas-Ferry, a student at the Art Students League, in the spring of 1978. Late that year they rented an apartment near the League, and they married a few days before Christmas. This third marriage would be happy and lasting, and the couple would make their home in New Jersey in 1981.

Lee-Smith died of cancer in Albuquerque, New Mexico.

Work

In 1945, Lee-Smith had his first one-man exhibitions at the South Side Community Art Center and at Snowden Galleries in Chicago.

Paintings

 Man Running 1965, oil on canvas
 End of Act One 1984, Oil on canvas
 Double Exposure 1995, oil on canvas
 Stranger 1957–1958, oil on canvas
 Bouquet 1949, oil on canvas
 Artist’s Life No.2 1939, Lithograph

Prizes

 Cleveland Museum
 Freehand Drawing, 3rd Prize, 1938
 Linoprint, Honourable Mention, 1938
 Lithography, 3rd Prize, 1939
 Lithography, 2nd Prize, 1940
 Atlanta University
 Oil Painting, Purchase Prize, 1943
 Detroit Institute of Art
 Oil, Anthony Maiuello Prize, 1951
 EMILY LOWE AWARD, Oil, 1957
 Allied Artists of America
 Oil, Allied Artists Prize, 1958
 American Society of African Culture
 Oil, 1st Purchase Prize 1960

Notes

References
 The African American Registry, biography
 Jet, obituary, March 22, 1999
 Johnson, Ken. The New York Times, review, September 29, 2000
 Cotter, Holland. The New York Times, obituary, March 1, 1999
 Raynor, Vivien. The New York Times, review, November 12, 1995
 Raynor, Vivien. The New York Times, December 4, 1988
 Lebowitz, Cathy. Art In America, review, January 2001
 Art and Architecture of New Jersey, biography
King-Hammond, Hughie Lee-Smith, Pomegranate Communications, Inc. 2010
Hughie Lee-Smith, Biographical material, Cleveland Arts Museum
The Russell and Rowends Jelliffe Collection: Prints and Drawings from The Karamu Workshop, 1929-1941

External links
 Appleton Museum of Art
 Smithsonian Archives of American Art
 The Piper
 Confrontation, Hunter Museum of American Art''
 Discussion on a Rooftop, Howard University
 Smithsonian American Art Museum
Works of Hughie Lee-Smith at Cleveland Public Library

1915 births
1999 deaths
People from Cranbury, New Jersey
People from Eustis, Florida
Painters from Florida
Wayne State University alumni
20th-century American painters
American male painters
Modern painters
People of the New Deal arts projects
Artists from Cleveland
Painters from Ohio
20th-century American male artists
20th-century African-American painters